The International Clinical Phonetics and Linguistics Association (ICPLA) is an international scholarly association dedicated to the study of speech disorders and  language disorders.  It was founded in 1991.  The Association sponsors a biennial conference. The official journal of the Association is Clinical Linguistics and Phonetics published since 1987 by Informa Healthcare. It has appeared on a monthly basis since 2007.

References

Linguistic societies